Abaamang is a town in central Equatorial Guinea. It is located in Wele-Nzas several kilometres north of Nsemensoc.

References

Populated places in Wele-Nzas